Papendorp is a small village on the Atlantic Ocean coastline of Western Cape Province, South Africa. This village resides under Matzikama Local Municipality.

Papendorp is located at the mouth of the Olifants River and at high tide it is possible to navigate to Lutzville on a flat-bottomed boat, about 30 km upstream. Ebenhaezer, a Rhenish mission station established in 1831 is located a few km further inland, on the road between Papendorp and Lutzville. There are salt pans in the area that are exploited commercially. Strandfontein is located a few km south down the coast.

References

External links
Directions from Lutzville to Papendorp

Populated places in the Matzikama Local Municipality